"La Luna" is a song by American singer Belinda Carlisle, released in 1989 as the second single from her third album, Runaway Horses (1989).

Music video
The accompanying music video for "La Luna" was directed by Andy Morahan. It features Carlisle lying naked in bed fantasizing about a night à la Cinderella.

B-side
The UK 7" B-side is "Whatever It Takes" (LP Version)  4:52

Charts

Weekly charts

Year-end charts

References

1989 songs
1989 singles
Belinda Carlisle songs
MCA Records singles
Music videos directed by Andy Morahan
Songs written by Rick Nowels
Songs written by Ellen Shipley
Song recordings produced by Rick Nowels
Spanish-language songs
Virgin Records singles
Songs about the Moon